Pas très catholique (Not Very Catholic, English title Something Fishy) is a 1994 French comedy film written and directed by Tonie Marshall. It was entered into the 44th Berlin International Film Festival.

Plot 
Years ago Maxime left her husband and child to strike out on her own, out of her upper class background and into a more bohemian lifestyle, chain-smoking and having affairs with lovers of both genders. Now a private detective, her boss tasks Maxime with training the new person (and the boss's lover). She also finds that her path has crossed with her ex-husband and son as a result of her latest case involving real estate fraud and murders.

Cast
 Anémone : Maxime Chabrier
 Michel Roux : Andre Dutemps
 Roland Bertin : Monsieur Paul
 Christine Boisson : Florence
 Denis Podalydès : Martin
 Grégoire Colin : Baptiste Vaxelaire
 Michel Didym : Jacques Devinals
 Micheline Presle : Mme. Loussine
 Bernard Verley : Noel Vaxelaire
 Josiane Stoléru

Reception 
Derek Elley reviewed the film for Variety, writing that "Though dominated by a striking, lived-in performance from Gallic comedienne Anemone, "Something Fishy" is too easygoing for its own good." Carrie Tarr and Brigitte Rollet cover the film in Cinema and the Second Sex, stating that "Marshall's empathy with her original, outspoken heroine is obvious in the endless close-ups of Anémone/Max's aging, unconventionally attractive face and body, and the way she is constantly in shot, by day and by night, in the streets of Paris and in her bedsit or office, on the move and at rest, insolent and melancholy."

In Fifty Years Berlinale Wolfgang Jacobson et al noted that the movie was the "surprise of the competition" at the 44th Berlin International Film Festival.

Further reading

References

External links
 
 

1994 films
1994 comedy-drama films
1990s French-language films
Films directed by Tonie Marshall
French comedy-drama films
Female bisexuality in film
French detective films
1990s French films